Naka Rabemanantsoa is a pianist and composer of vakondrazana and ba-gasy music from the central highlands of Madagascar. He was a major composer for the Malagasy theatrical genre that reached its peak between 1920 and 1940 at the Theatre d'Isotry in Antananarivo. His pieces were typically written for piano, and although his pieces were often adapted for solo, duet or choral vocal accompaniment sung in the Malagasy language, he was a strong proponent of preserving strictly instrumental accompaniment for theatrical performances. His songs form part of the canon of classical Malagasy piano music, and a street in downtown Antananarivo is named after him.

See also
Music of Madagascar

Notes

Bibliography

Malagasy musicians